Aaron Hawks (born May 12, 1973) is an American multidisciplinary artist, best known for his conceptual fetish photography and installation art.

Career
Born and raised in Seattle, Hawks lived and worked in San Francisco, Los Angeles, and Berlin before relocating to Brooklyn, New York in 2012. Throughout the years his work featured a diverse array of subjects in the "alternative" art scene, including artists Michael Hussar, and Molly Crabapple; alternative models Ulorin Vex, and Darenzia; and pornographic film actors Skin Diamond, Asphyxia Noir, and Emily Addison.

Hawks’ photography has been featured in magazines such as Juxtapoz, and American Photo, and his work published in photography compilations by Taschen, Goliath Books, and Little, Brown and Company. His short art film 'Salt' (2002) was shown at Roxie Theater in San Francisco.

See also
 Erotic photography
 Fetish art
 Nude (art)
 Depictions of nudity
 Nude photography
 Installation art
 Art films

References

External links
 Official Website
 Aaron Hawks' Instagram
 Aaron Hawks interview, Fine Art TV (2008)
 Aaron Hawks on Model Mayhem
 Aaron Hawks' Books

1973 births
Fetish photographers
American erotic photographers
American installation artists
Artists from Seattle
Artists from Brooklyn
Living people